Brendon Michael Snyman (born 21 August 1984) is a South African rugby union player who most recently played for the . His regular position is lock.

Career

Early career

SWD Eagles

Griquas
He joined  in 2006, where he spent the next four seasons and racking up 67 appearances in his time in Kimberley in both the Vodacom Cup and Currie Cup competitions.

Eastern Province Kings

Leopards

Montauban
He moved to France to join Montauban for the 2014–15 Pro D2 season.

London Welsh
After one season in France, Snyman moved to England to join RFU Championship side London Welsh.

Representative rugby
He was included in the South Africa President's XV squad for the 2013 IRB Tbilisi Cup and later confirmed as captain of the team. They won the tournament after winning all three their matches.

References

South African rugby union players
Living people
1984 births
People from Polokwane
SWD Eagles players
Griquas (rugby union) players
Eastern Province Elephants players
Leopards (rugby union) players
University of Pretoria alumni
Rugby union locks
Rugby union players from Limpopo